"Love Is the Answer" is a song written by Todd Rundgren and performed with his band Utopia. It is the closing track on their 1977 album Oops! Wrong Planet, and was the only single released from the album.

England Dan & John Ford Coley version

In 1979, American soft rock duo England Dan & John Ford Coley released their version as the lead single from their seventh studio album Dr. Heckle and Mr. Jive. It reached number 10 on the Billboard Hot 100 chart in May 1979 and spent two weeks atop the Billboard Adult Contemporary chart. John Ford Coley was quoted as saying: "Of all the songs we released as singles, that was my favorite. The song first of all had a classical base, and the middle had a gospel section which I loved."

Charts

Other versions
The song has been covered several times by Christian and mainstream artists.
 Sheila Walsh recorded it in 1988 for her album Say So, and performed it on her very first The 700 Club appearance as co-hostess.
 Bill Cantos and Justo Almario covered it in 1995 for the album Who Are You.
 Cindy Morgan covered it in 2000 for her greatest hits album, Best So Far.
 Bob Carlisle and Bryan Duncan recorded a gospel blues version in 2001.
 Filipino singer Gary Valenciano covered the song on his 2001 album, Revive.
 In 2004, it was the title track of Glen Campbell's album Love Is the Answer: 24 Songs of Faith, Hope and Love.
 A cover of this song is a bonus track on the Limited Edition CD of Rick Springfield's The Day After Yesterday (2005).
 British singer Rumer released in 2015 an EP named "Love is the answer" with a cover in it.

See also
List of Billboard Adult Contemporary number ones of 1979

References

1977 songs
1977 singles
1979 singles
England Dan & John Ford Coley songs
Glen Campbell songs
Songs written by Todd Rundgren
Song recordings produced by Todd Rundgren
Song recordings produced by Kyle Lehning
Big Tree Records singles
Bearsville Records singles
Utopia (band) songs